In electronics, TO-5 is a designation for a standardized metal semiconductor package used for transistors and some integrated circuits. The TO element stands for "transistor outline" and refers to a series of technical drawings produced by JEDEC. The first commercial silicon transistors, the 2N696 and 2N697 from Fairchild Semiconductor, came in a TO-5 package.

Construction and orientation
The tab is located 45° from pin 1, which is typically the emitter. The pins are isolated from the package by individual glass-metal seals, or by a single resin potting. Sometimes one pin is connected directly to the metal case.

Variants
Several variants of the original TO-5 package have the same cap dimensions but differ in the number and length of the leads (wires). Somewhat incorrectly, TO-5 and TO-39 are often used in manufacturer's literature as synonyms for any package with the cap dimensions of TO-5, regardless of the number of leads, or even for any package with the diameter of TO-5, regardless of the cap height and the number of leads. There are variants with between 2 and 12 leads. Before the introduction of dual in-line packages in 1965, integrated circuits were packaged mostly in metal can packages such as the TO-5 variants with more than 3 leads.

TO-39 / TO-9 / TO-16 / TO-42
The TO-39, TO-9, and TO-16 packages have 3 leads and differ in the shortened leads mentioned above from TO-5. Additionally, the TO-9 and TO-16 packages do not have a tab. The TO-42 package is almost identical to the TO-5 package (including the long leads) but has four stand-offs at the bottom of the base that keep the base about 0.5 mm above the circuit board. Possibly the TO-16 and TO-42 designations were not actually used.

TO-12 / TO-33

The TO-12 and TO-33 packages have 4 leads. TO-33 has  leads like TO-5 while TO-12 has  leads. For transistors, the fourth wire is typically connected to the metal case as a means of electromagnetic shielding for radio frequency applications.

TO-75
The TO-75 package has 6 leads (at most one of those may be omitted). The minimum angle between two adjacent leads is 60°.

TO-76 / TO-77

The TO-76 and TO-77 packages have 8 leads (up to three of those may be omitted). The minimum angle between two adjacent leads is 45°.

TO-78 / TO-79 / TO-80 / TO-99

The TO-78, TO-79, TO-80, and TO-99 packages have 8 leads (up to three of those may be omitted). The minimum angle between two adjacent leads is 45°. These packages differ from other variants in the height of the cap.

TO-74
The TO-74 package has 10 leads (at most one of those may be omitted). The minimum angle between two adjacent leads is 36°.

TO-96 / TO-97 / TO-100
The TO-96, TO-97, and TO-100 packages have 10 leads (at most one of those may be omitted). The minimum angle between two adjacent leads is 36°. This allows a slightly increased  chip area in a cap of unchanged diameter.

TO-73
The TO-73 package has 12 leads (at most one of those may be omitted). The minimum angle between two adjacent leads is 30°.

TO-101
The TO-101 package has 12 leads (at most one of those may be omitted). The minimum angle between two adjacent leads is 30°. This allows a slightly increased  chip area in a cap of unchanged diameter.

TO-205

The different outlines are now defined as variants of TO-205: TO-5 is renamed to TO-205-AA, TO-12 to TO-205-AB, TO-33 to TO-205-AC, TO-39 to TO-205-AD.

National Standards

References

External links
 TO-5 package from EESemi.com

Semiconductor packages